The 2021–22 South African Premier Division season from 20 August 2021 to 30 May 2022 (known as the DSTV Premiership for sponsorship reasons) was the 26th season of the Premier Soccer League since its establishment in 1996. Mamelodi Sundowns were the four-time defending champions. This season's winner will qualify for the 2022–23 CAF Champions League along with the second placed team. The 3rd placed team and Nedbank Cup winners qualify for the 2022–23 CAF Confederation Cup.

Team changes

The following teams have changed division since the 2020–21 season.

To National First Division
Relegated from 2020–21 South African Premier Division
 Black Leopards

From National First Division
Promoted to 2021–22 South African Premier Division
 Sekhukhune United (promoted as champions)

Purchased statuses
 Marumo Gallants purchased their status from Tshakhuma Tsha Madzivhandila
 Royal AM purchased their Premiership status from Bloemfontein Celtic

Teams

Stadiums and locations

Number of teams by province

League table

Results

Statistics

Top goalscorers

Hat-tricks

Most Assists

References

External links 
 Official website

South Africa
Premier Division
Premier Soccer League seasons